The 1965–66 DDR-Oberliga was the 17th season of the DDR-Oberliga, the first tier of league football in East Germany.

The league was contested by fourteen teams. National People's Army club FC Vorwärts Berlin won the championship, the club's fifth of six national East German championships all up.

Henning Frenzel of 1. FC Lokomotive Leipzig was the league's top scorer with 22 goals, while Jürgen Nöldner of FC Vorwärts Berlin won the seasons East German Footballer of the year award.

On the strength of the 1965–66 title Vorwärts qualified for the 1966–67 European Cup where the club was knocked out by Górnik Zabrze in the first round. Seventh-placed club BSG Chemie Leipzig qualified for the 1966–67 European Cup Winners' Cup as the seasons FDGB-Pokal winner and was knocked out by Standard Liège in the second round. Third-placed 1. FC Lokomotive Leipzig qualified for the 1966–67 Inter-Cities Fairs Cup where it was knocked out in the quarter finals by Kilmarnock F.C.

In December 1965 and January 1966 East German football saw a major restructuring with the introduction of football clubs (FC) as separate entities from the sports clubs (SC). With one exception, this only affected clubs playing in the DDR-Oberliga at the time. As a result of the restructuring, ASK Vorwärts Berlin became FC Vorwärts Berlin, SC Motor Jena became FC Carl Zeiss Jena, SC Leipzig became 1. FC Lokomotive Leipzig, SC Empor Rostock became FC Hansa Rostock, SC Karl-Marx-Stadt became FC Karl-Marx-Stadt, SC Dynamo Berlin became Berliner FC Dynamo, SC Chemie Halle became Hallescher FC Chemie, SC Turbine Erfurt became FC Rot-Weiss Erfurt and SC Aufbau Magdeburg became SC Magdeburg and then 1. FC Magdeburg. Outside the DDR-Oberliga, TSC Berlin became 1. FC Union Berlin. TSC Berlin was only playing in the second tier DDR-Liga at the time. Hower, 1. FC Union Berlin finished the 1965-66 DDR-Liga Nord on first place and was promoted to the 1966-67 DDR-Oberliga. With the exception of FC Vorwärts Berlin, all football clubs retained their name until the disbanding of the Oberliga in 1991 and, in some cases, beyond that.

Table
The 1965–66 season saw two newly promoted clubs, Hallescher FC Chemie and FC Rot-Weiss Erfurt.

Results

References

Sources

External links
 Das Deutsche Fussball Archiv  Historic German league tables

1965-66
1
Ober